Argyll is a rural locality in the Central Highlands Region, Queensland, Australia.

History 
On 17 May 2019, the Queensland Government decided to discontinue the locality of Mistake Creek and absorb its land into the neighbouring localities of Clermont, Laglan, Frankfield and Peak Vale and to extend Peak Vale into the Central Highlands Region by altering the boundaries of Argyll.

On 17 April 2020, the Queensland Government re-drew the boundaries of localities within the Central Highlands Region by replacing the locality of The Gemfields with three new localities of Rubyvale, Sapphire Central and Anakie Siding (around the towns of Rubyvale, Sapphire, and Anakie respectively). This included adjusting the boundaries of other existing localities in the Region to accommodate these changes; Argyll lost its south-eastern corner to become the northern part of the new Rubyvale and the north-eastern part of the new Sapphire Central.

Heritage listings 
Argyll has a number of heritage-listed sites, including:
 Tomahawk Creek Huts

References

External links 

Central Highlands Region
Localities in Queensland